, known as SWERY or Swery65, is a Japanese video game director and writer. He was one of the founding members of the game development studio Access Games which is based in Osaka. His roles in the company included director, designer, and writer. He is the director of the games Spy Fiction, Deadly Premonition and D4: Dark Dreams Don't Die. He then left the company in 2016, and he founded his own studio, named White Owls Inc.

Career
Suehiro received a degree in film and video advertising at Osaka University of Arts. After graduation he decided to join the game industry and worked at various game companies including SNK. In January 2002 he was one of the founding members of Access Games.

The first game he directed was the PlayStation 2 game Spy Fiction released in 2003. The game is a third-person military themed stealth game and the target audience was Western players rather than Japanese players.

Production began in 2004 on a game titled Rainy Woods, which was then cancelled in 2007. Work was restarted under the new title Deadly Premonition and it was released in 2010. A survival horror game, it also placed emphasis on targeting Western gamers rather than Japanese players. That game made its way to the 2012 Guinness World Records Gamer's Edition with the title "Most Critically Polarizing Survival Horror Game" because reviews of the game ranged so heavily.

In 2014, he partnered with Microsoft to develop an Xbox One game titled D4: Dark Dreams Don't Die, which utilizes the Kinect motion-sensing device. The game was highlighted at GDC Next 2013 as one of their "GDC Next 10", where chosen developers give talks on the inspiration behind their upcoming games.

In 2015, he gave a lecture in Osaka and at GDC 2015 regarding physical input in video games and the Kinect device. He also opened a booth along with Access Games at Penny Arcade Expo East 2015.

In November 2015, he announced that he would be taking a health-related break from game development in order to focus on recovering from reactive hypoglycemia. During his sabbatical, he also became a priest, within Jōdo Shinshū Buddhism.

On 31 October 2016, he announced his departure from Access Games. A new video game studio was later founded by Suehiro on 1 November 2016 as White Owls Inc. White Owls was formally revealed to the public on 15 January 2017.

Works

References

External links
 SWERY (@Swery65) on Twitter
 
 Hidetaka Suehiro(SWERY) on Facebook
 Hidetaka Suehiro's "Cafe SWERY65" blog

1973 births
Living people
Jōdo Shinshū Buddhist priests
Japanese video game designers
Japanese video game directors
People from Osaka